This is a list of diplomatic missions of Seychelles. The Indian Ocean island country of the Seychelles only a few diplomatic missions overseas, although it has a very large number of honorary consulates (not listed below).

Africa

 Addis Ababa (Embassy)

 Pretoria (High Commission)

Asia

 Beijing (Embassy)
 Shanghai (Consulate-General)

 New Delhi (High Commission)

 Abu Dhabi (Embassy)

Europe

 Brussels (Embassy)

 Paris (Embassy)

 London (High Commission)

Multilateral organisations

Geneva (Mission to the United Nations)
New York (Mission to the United Nations)

See also
 Foreign relations of Seychelles
 List of diplomatic missions in Seychelles
 Visa policy of Seychelles

References

 Ministry of Foreign Affairs of Seychelles

List
Seychelles
Diplomatic missions